"Today" is a folk rock ballad written by Marty Balin and Paul Kantner from the band Jefferson Airplane. It first appeared on their album Surrealistic Pillow with a live version later appearing on the expanded rerelease of Bless Its Pointed Little Head. Marty Balin said, "I wrote it to try to meet Tony Bennett. He was recording in the next studio. I admired him, so I thought I'd write him a song. I never got to meet him, but the Airplane ended up doing it." Jerry Garcia plays the simple, repetitive but poignant lead guitar riff on the song.

Personnel
Marty Balin – lead vocals, tambourine
Grace Slick – vocals
Jorma Kaukonen – guitar
Paul Kantner – guitar, vocals
Jack Casady – bass
Spencer Dryden – drums
Jerry Garcia – lead guitar

Cover versions

Balin released a new version on his 1999 solo album, Marty Balin Greatest Hits.
Black Sheep samples the song on "Similak Child" from their 1991 album, A Wolf in Sheep's Clothing.
The song was covered by Jubilant Sykes on his 2004 album Wait For Me. In the liner notes the song is mis-attributed to Randy Sparks, who wrote another song of the same name for the soundtrack of the 1964 film Advance to the Rear. This other song was performed on the soundtrack by The New Christy Minstrels, a folk group founded by Sparks.
Dokken on their Broken Bones album in 2012
Renée Fleming also covered it on her 2010 album Dark Hope.
Tom Scott covered the song on his 1967 album The Honeysuckle Breeze. The song features a quicker tempo than the Jefferson Airplane version and also features a long saxophone solo. The song also appears in the episode, "Riley Wuz Here" of the animated television series, The Boondocks. Parts of the saxophone solo were sampled in the Pete Rock & CL Smooth song They Reminisce Over You (T.R.O.Y.).
Norwegian avant-garde musicians Ulver covered it on their 2012 all-cover release Childhood's End.
Russian band The Re-Stoned covered it on their 2012 Album Plasma.

References

1967 songs
1960s ballads
Songs written by Marty Balin
Songs written by Paul Kantner
Jefferson Airplane songs
Song recordings produced by Rick Jarrard
Folk ballads
Rock ballads